Victoria López Serrano Felix (born 26 July 2006), known as Vicky López, is a Spanish professional footballer who plays as an attacking midfielder and a winger for Primera Federación club FC Barcelona B.

Early life
López was born in Madrid to a Spanish father and a Nigerian mother.

Club career
López scored 60 goals in 17 matches during the 2020–21 youth league season. She made her senior debut for Madrid CFF on 5 September 2021 as a 73rd-minute substitution in a 2–0 Primera División home loss to Athletic Bilbao.

On 25 January 2023 she made history by becoming the youngest goal scorer in Barca history when she scored in Barcelona 7-0 win against Levante Las Planas in a Primera División game.

International career
López has been called up to the Spain women's national under-17 football team. She is also eligible to represent Nigeria and has shown interest.

Honours

FC Barcelona 

 Supercopa de España: 2022–23

References

External links

2006 births
Living people
Footballers from Madrid
Spanish women's footballers
Women's association football midfielders
Women's association football wingers
Madrid CFF players
Primera División (women) players
Spain women's youth international footballers
Spanish people of Nigerian descent
Spanish sportspeople of African descent
Sportspeople of Nigerian descent